Franklin High School is the largest 9th-12th grade public high school in Macon County, North Carolina. Franklin High is just parallel to downtown Franklin.

Notable alumni
 Cory Asbury (2004), Christian musician and worship pastor
 Shawn Bryson (1995), former collegiate and NFL football player

References 

Public high schools in North Carolina
Schools in Macon County, North Carolina